The women's hammer throw event at the 2015 African Games was held on 14 September.

Results

References

Hammer
2015 in women's athletics